The Historic Army Aircraft Flight (HAAF) is a charitable trust which brings the history of British Army flying to life by preserving and flying a unique collection of historic British Army aircraft formerly operated by the Army Air Corps (AAC).  It serves as a 'living museum' for ex-service personnel commemorative and memorial purposes, as an aid to recruiting, and for supporting wider British Army heritage in public.  It features an aerial display group; comprising a de Havilland Beaver, a Westland Scout, an Agusta-Bell Sioux, and an Auster AOP.9.

History
It was created in order to save and maintain one example of each aircraft operated since the Army Air Corps inception in 1957. Its purpose was to preserve the AAC's aviation heritage for future generations.

The aircraft of the AHAF were originally supported in part by the Ministry of Defence (MoD), along with additional donations and any income from air displays it undertook.  Although the AHAF was self-administered by its own charitable company, in 2013, the MoD withdrew all official public funding.  This forced the AHAF into a state of dormancy or 'suspended animation'.

In order to ensure that its aircraft remain airworthy and available, four of the AHAF aircraft (Auster, Beaver, Scout, and Sioux) were transferred to the Civil Register of the UK Civil Aviation Authority (UK CAA); this helps to reduce both maintenance servicing times and costs.

Now known as the Historic Army Aircraft Flight (HAAF), it operates as a Registered Charity (charity number: 1024043, as the Historic Aircraft Flight Trust), governed by the Historic Army Aircraft Flight Trustee Limited. Registered in England and Wales under company number 09572211, it is listed under the standard industrial classification of economic activities (SIC) as 'Museums activities' (91020).

Aircraft
The Historic Army Aircraft Flight includes the following retired AAC aircraft:

More details of the aircraft in the Flight can be seen on the website.

See also

Battle of Britain Memorial Flight (BBMF) — official historic aircraft flight of the Royal Air Force (RAF)
Royal Navy Historic Flight (RNHF) — former official historic aircraft flight of the Royal Navy (RN)
Blue Eagles — former official helicopter air display unit of the Army Air Corps (AAC)
Army Flying Museum — official flying museum of the Army Air Corps (AAC)
Shuttleworth Collection — at Old Warden near Biggleswade, Bedfordshire, England
Commemorative Air Force — in Midland, Texas, USA.

References

External links

HAAF.uk — official website

Military units and formations established in 1980
Organisations based in Hampshire
Museums in Hampshire
Aircraft preservation
Army aviation